USS Margaret O (SP-614) was a civilian motorboat that temporarily served in the U.S. Navy during World War I. She was outfitted by the Navy as a patrol craft and patrolled on the U.S. East Coast. Post-war she was returned to her owner.

Built in Massachusetts
Margaret O, a 55-foot motor pleasure boat, was built in 1915 at Neponset, Massachusetts, by George Lawley & Sons.

World War I service

After being acquired by the Navy for World War I service she was placed in commission in October 1917 as USS Margaret O (SP-614). Her name was changed to SP-614 in April 1918. She was assigned section patrol use, presumably in New England waters.

Post-war disposition

Post-war she was decommissioned and then returned to her owner in April 1919.

References

External links
Photo gallery at Naval Historical Center
Photo gallery at navsource.org

World War I patrol vessels of the United States
Motorboats of the United States Navy
Ships built in Boston
1915 ships